Thomas Henry McDonald (25 September 1895 – 1969) was a Scottish footballer who played as an inside forward.

Career 
McDonald was born in Inverness, Scotland and played for Rangers in his early career; the Glasgow club won the Scottish Football League in both the seasons he was with them, but he only had a minor role in each.

He is best known for his time at Newcastle United who he joined in 1921 and was to spend a decade with the club. At 5' 8" he was one of Newcastle's taller forwards of the time. He made his debut on 5 March 1921 against Middlesbrough. Whilst on Tyneside he made 367 appearances for the club and scored 113 goals. He won the FA Cup in 1924 and the old First Division Championship in 1926–27. He joined York City in May 1931.

Personal life 
McDonald served in the Royal Horse Artillery during the First World War.

References

1895 births
1969 deaths
Scottish footballers
Association football inside forwards
Rangers F.C. players
Newcastle United F.C. players
York City F.C. players
Goole Town F.C. players
Highland Football League players
Scottish Football League players
English Football League players
Caledonian F.C. players
Inverness Thistle F.C. players
Footballers from Inverness
British Army personnel of World War I
Royal Horse Artillery soldiers
FA Cup Final players
Scottish military personnel